A sombrero function (sometimes called besinc function or jinc function) is the 2-dimensional polar coordinate analog of the sinc function, and is so-called because it is shaped like a sombrero hat.  This function is frequently used in image processing. It can be defined through the Bessel function of the first kind where .

The normalization factor  makes . Sometimes the  factor is omitted, giving the following alternative definition:

The factor of 2 is also often omitted, giving yet another definition and causing the function maximum to be 0.5:

References

Signal processing
Elementary special functions